The 2023 Munich Ravens season is the inaugural season of the newly founded Munich Ravens in the European League of Football for the 2023 season.

Preseason
The first steps of the franchise was the hiring of former Hamburg Sea Devils offensive quality control coach and NFL (Oakland Raiders, Carolina Panthers) offensive coordinator John Shoop and general manager Sebastian Stolz, former PR-manager of the Hamburg Sea Devils in the NFL Europa and strategy manager for the Oakland Raiders. Another important hiring was the addition of the newly director of sport, former Raiders Tirol quarterback and MVP of the 2022 European League of Football season Sean Shelton.

In preparation for the new season, the franchise held an invitational tryout at the Olympiastadion (Munich) with several dozen participants. After that, the first signings of players were announced, beginning with former Panthers Wrocław Darius Robinson. As the first franchise quarterback Chad Jeffries was announced, coming from the former Danube Dragons and 2022 league MVP.

Regular season

Standings

Roster

Staff

Notes

References 

Munich Ravens seasons
Munich Ravens
Munich Ravenss